Outwood Academy Haydock (formerly Haydock Secondary Modern School and then Haydock High School) is a coeducational secondary school located in Haydock in the English county of Merseyside.

The school first opened as a secondary modern school in February 1932, and later became a comprehensive.

Previously a community school administered by St Helens Metropolitan Borough Council, in January 2022 Haydock High School converted to academy status and was renamed Outwood Academy Haydock. The school is now sponsored by Outwood Grange Academies Trust.

Notable former pupils
Martyn Lancaster, former footballer
Nick McCabe, musician and lead guitarist of The Verve

References

External links
 

Secondary schools in St Helens, Merseyside
Educational institutions established in 1932
1932 establishments in England
Academies in St Helens, Merseyside
Haydock